Since its beginning until the year 1991, service rank was a permanent element of service with the Deutsche Reichsbahn, the former German national railway system, whether as a civil servant or as an employee. Every railroad employee was obliged to wear the conferred insignia while on duty and entitled to do so off duty. The service rank was conferred with a certificate. The first conferral was designated as a certification, each additional conferral as a promotion.

Service Ranks from 1924 to 1935

As a result of a competition, a single service uniform that eliminated of the previous badges and embellishments was introduced throughout the Reich for all members of the Reichsbahn. Service rank and respective division were recognizable from the collar insignia.

Service Ranks from 1935 to 1945

Uniform regulations of 1935
In July 1935, a new uniform was introduced with specialty and division badges and epaulets as rank insignia for civil servants and workers.

Uniform regulations of 1941

The first uniform regulations of 1941 exchanged the pips on the epaulets for rosettes. They also introduced collar patches denoting career groups.

Uniform regulations of 1944

Service Ranks from 1945 to 1957

After the end of the Second World War, the pre-war service ranks were retained in the Deutsche Reichsbahn of the GDR.  The uniforms, however, were soon brought into accord with the Soviet model. This was especially apparent in the epaulets. Basically, many railway employees wore uniforms, and the military cut and service grades reflected the semi-military character of the railways in the GDR.  This was combined with an overly elevated degree of security awareness, readiness, and secrecy.

Service Ranks from 1957 to 1962

The collar insignia borders of rank groups I to IV bore the colors of the respective main service branch.  The example shows a collar insignia of the main service branch operations and traffic service (red).

Rank group I

The cap gimp of this rank group was blue interwoven with gold.

Rank Group II 

The cap gimp of this rank group was blue and gold in the relationship of 2:2.

Service Ranks from 1962 to 1974

The main service branches were recognizable from the colors of the piping on the caps as well as by the borders of the epaulets and collar insignia.

In this context

 red for operations and traffic service
 blue for mechanical management
 gray for coach management
 green for railroad property and construction
 yellow for security and communications

Rank group I

The cap gimp of this rank group was blue interwoven with gold.

Apprentices wore epaulets as with the Eisenbahner service rank, but instead of the star, one or two loops in gold with blue stripes were worn.

Rank Group II 

The cap gimp of this rank group was blue and gold in the relationship of 2:2.

Students of the Gotha Engineering School, the Eisenach and Altenburg high schools and the Dresden engineering school for Railroad Studies wore the epaulets similar to the service rank of Reichsbahn-Untersekretär, except that instead of the stars, a gold loop with blue stripes was worn.

After the second semester, students in the engineering schools wore epaulets similar to Reichsbahn-Untersekretär, except that instead of stars, two gold loops with blue stripes were worn.

Service Ranks from 1974 to 1991

The color differentiation of the main service branches was retained (see 1962 to 1974)

The collar insignia borders of rank groups I to IV bore the colors of the respective main service branch. The example shows a collar insignia of the main service branch operations and traffic service (red).

Service ranks were discontinued by the Reichsbahn in 1991.  Every employee received a note which stated only that he was entitled to continue wearing the previous rank "off duty".

Rank group I
The cap gimp of this rank group was blue interwoven with gold.

Rank Group II 
The cap gimp of this rank group was blue and gold in the relationship of 2:2.

Rank Group III

Rank Group IV

Rank Group V

See also 
Deutsche Reichsbahn (East Germany)

References 

History of rail transport in Germany
Uniforms
German railway-related lists
Ranks